Nowogród Bobrzański  is a town on the Bóbr river in Zielona Góra County, Lubusz Voivodeship, Poland, with 5,165 inhabitants (2019). It is the administrative seat of the Gmina Nowogród Bobrzański. The gmina was created through the integration of Nowogród Bobrzański with the nearby Krzystkowice. It covers the area of 259,4 km2.

History

The historic town was established in 1202 on the eastern banks of the Bóbr as the seat of a Castellan of Lower Silesia. The Piast duke Henry I the Bearded established a college of Augustinian canons here in 1217. From 1274 Nowogród Bobrzański was part of the Silesian Duchy of Żagań. It received city rights in 1314. It was consumed by fire and destroyed by plagues in 1350, 1479 and 1723. In 1827 mineral springs were discovered and many tourists began to arrive.

Naumburg am Bober was the seat of the firm Ostdeutsche Tiefbau GmbH ("East German Civil Engineering, Inc."),  which was one of the contractors responsible for razing the Warsaw Ghetto. Nowogród lost its city rights in 1945 following World War II due to depopulation, and again acquired them in 1988 by the merger with the adjacent Lower Lusatian town of Krzystkowice (Christianstadt), the site of the Nazi German subcamp of Gross Rosen with an estimated number of 40,000 Polish and other victims.

Geography
The highest hill has 166.4 meters altitude. There are two rivers: the Bóbr and the Brzeźniczanka. Woods take up 60% of the land. Overall, the forest constitutes 16.5% of Zielona Góra district. The pine is the most common tree. The age of an average tree is about 48 years. The annual growth of trees is 2.65 cubic metres per one hectare. The abundance of trees is high, as it is about 125 cubic metres for one hectare. There are two nurseries: Tuchola and Guzów.

The Forest Inspectorate of Nowogród Bobrzański manages the following protection areas:
 The nature reserve “Dąbrowa Brzeźnicza”
 Peat bogs with rare species of animals such as beavers, cranes, snipes, harriers and rare species of plants, including ivy and laurel.
 Nature monument made up by 8 old-growth trees, and the erratic boulder called “Diabelski Kamień”.

Points of interest
 St. Bartholomew Church from 12th century
 Assumption Church from 13th century
 Ruins of the factory where munitions were produced by Nazi Germany in 1940–1945

Twin towns – sister cities
See twin towns of Gmina Nowogród Bobrzański.

References

Cities and towns in Lubusz Voivodeship
Zielona Góra County